The United Nations Educational, Scientific and Cultural Organization (UNESCO) World Heritage Sites are places of importance to cultural or natural heritage as described in the UNESCO World Heritage Convention, established in 1972. Cultural heritage consists of monuments (such as architectural works, monumental sculptures, or inscriptions), groups of buildings, and sites (including archaeological sites). Natural features (consisting of physical and biological formations), geological and physiographical formations (including habitats of threatened species of animals and plants), and natural sites which are important from the point of view of science, conservation or natural beauty, are defined as natural heritage. Ireland ratified the convention on 16 September 1991.

, Ireland has two sites on the list, and a further seven on the tentative list. The first site listed was Brú na Bóinne – Archaeological Ensemble of the Bend of the Boyne, in 1993. The second site, Skellig Michael, was listed in 1996. Both are cultural sites, as determined by the organisation's selection criteria. All tentative sites have been nominated in 2010.



World Heritage Sites
UNESCO lists sites under ten criteria; each entry must meet at least one of the criteria. Criteria i through vi are cultural, and vii through x are natural.

Tentative list
In addition to sites inscribed on the World Heritage List, member states can maintain a list of tentative sites that they may consider for nomination. Nominations for the World Heritage List are only accepted if the site was previously listed on the tentative list. , Ireland recorded seven sites on its tentative list. The sites, along with the year they were included on the tentative list are:

References 

World Heritage Sites in the Republic of Ireland
Ireland
Conservation in the Republic of Ireland
Lists of buildings and structures in the Republic of Ireland
World Heritage Sites
Archaeological sites in the Republic of Ireland
National Monuments of Ireland